The United States Army Center of Military History (CMH) is a directorate within the United States Army Training and Doctrine Command. The Institute of Heraldry remains within the Office of the Administrative Assistant to the Secretary of the Army. The center is responsible for the appropriate use of history and military records throughout the United States Army. Traditionally, this mission has meant recording the official history of the army in both peace and war, while advising the army staff on historical matters. CMH is the flagship organization leading the Army Historical Program.

CMH is also in charge of the National Museum of the United States Army, which was recently completed at Fort Belvoir, Virginia.

Mission
The center traces its lineage back to historians under the Secretary of War who compiled the Official Records of the Rebellion, an extensive history of the American Civil War begun in 1874. A similar work on World War I was prepared by the Historical Section of the Army War College.

The modern organization of the army's historical efforts dates from the creation of the General Staff historical branch in July 1943, with Lt. Col. John M. Kemper appointed its first chief, and subsequent gathering of a team of historians, translators, editors, and cartographers to record the official history of World War II. They began publication of the United States Army in World War II series, which numbers 78 volumes, in 1946. Working under the direction of former Nazi General Franz Halder, the center's German section became pivotal in the dissemination of the Myth of the clean Wehrmacht in the United States. Since then, the center has produced detailed series on the Army's role in the Korean and Vietnam Wars and has begun a series on the U.S. Army in the Cold War. These works are supplemented by monographs and other publications on a mix of topics.

Since its formation, the center has provided historical support to the Army Secretariat and Staff, contributing background information for decision making, staff actions, command information programs, and public statements by army officials. It has expanded its role in the areas of military history education, the management of the army's museum system, and the introduction of automated data-retrieval systems. The center's work with army schools ensures that the study of history is a part of the training of officers and noncommissioned officers. Much of this educational work is performed at field historical offices and in army museums.

Historical activities
Under the direction of the chief of military history and his principal adviser, the army's chief historian, CMH's staff is involved in some 50 major writing projects. Many of these efforts involve new research that ranges from traditional studies in operational and administrative history to the examination of such areas as procurement, peacekeeping, and the global war on terror. Those works underway and projected are described in the Army Historical Program, an annual report to the Chief of Staff on the Army's historical activities. All center publications are listed in the catalog Publications of the United States Army Center of Military History, which explains how to access them.

In addition, army historians maintain the organizational history of army units, allowing the center to provide units of the Regular Army, the Army National Guard, and the Army Reserve with certificates of their lineage and honors and other historical material concerning their organizations. The center also determines the official designations for army units and works with the army staff during force reorganizations to preserve units with significant histories, as well as unit properties and related historical artifacts.

CMH also serves as a clearinghouse for the oral history programs in the army at all levels of command. It also conducts and preserves its own oral history collections, including those from the Vietnam War, Desert Storm, and the many recent contingency operations. In addition, the center's end-of-tour interviews within the Army Secretariat and Staff provide a basis for its annual histories of the Department of the Army.

As tangible representations of the service's mission, military artifacts and art enhance the soldier's understanding of the profession of arms. CMH manages a system of more than 120 army museums and their holdings, encompassing some 450,000 artifacts and 15,000 works of military art. The center also provides professional museum training, staff assistance visits, teams of combat artists such as those deployed under the Vietnam Combat Artists Program, and general museum support throughout the army. Current projects include the establishment of a National Museum of the United States Army at Fort Belvoir, Virginia, and a complementary Army Heritage and Educational Center at Carlisle Barracks, Pennsylvania.

The Chief of Military History is responsible for ensuring the appropriate use of military history in the teaching of strategy, tactics, logistics, and administration. This mission includes a requirement that military leaders at all levels be aware of the value of history in advancing military professionalism. To that end, the center holds a biennial history conference and workshop; publishes Army History, a professional bulletin devoted to informing the larger military history education community; and supplies readings for the army school system, including the ROTC community, and texts and other support for the army's staff ride program. In this effort, the chief of military history is assisted by a historical advisory committee that includes leading academic historians and representatives of the army school system.

The center has a large collection of Nazi art and ephemera collected as part of Denazification efforts after the Second World War. The holdings include four watercolour paintings by Adolf Hitler and several notable propaganda paintings depicting Hitler including In the Beginning Was the Word and The Standard Bearer.

Staff rides enable military leaders to retrace the course of a battle on the ground, deepening their understanding of the recurring fundamentals of military operations. As one of the army's major teaching devices, staff rides are particularly dependent on a careful knowledge of military history. Center historians lead rides directed by the Secretary of the Army and the Chief of Staff and attended by senior members of the army Staff.

It administers the army's Command History Program, to provide historical support to army organizations worldwide. In addition, since the first Persian Gulf War, the center has coordinated the deployment of military history detachments and the collection of historical data during peacekeeping and wartime operations, including those in northern Iraq, Somalia, Haiti, Bosnia, Kosovo, Afghanistan, and Iraq.

Fellowships and publications

To stimulate interest in military history in the army and the nation, CMH sponsors professional programs.
 Fellowships: To encourage and support dissertations in military history by graduate students, the center offers up to four dissertation fellowships each academic year. These fellowships carry a $9,000 stipend and access to the center's facilities and expertise. Although the fellowship program broadly defines the history of war on land, it selects winners with a preference for topics on the history of the U.S. Army. 
 Publications: The center has over 600 titles in its catalog. It is responsible for writing the official history of the U.S. Army. It is able to facilitate research, provide graphics and editorial support, and carry manuscripts through to publication. 
The center also publishes a quarterly history journal, Army History, known from 1983 to 1988 (No. 1 – No. 12) as The Army Historian. This award-winning magazine currently has a print run of over 10,000 copies and has been in circulation since 1983.

Historical services to the public
CMH's art and documents collections, library, and reference services are available to private researchers. Official priorities permitting, its historians, curators, and archivists advise researchers on military history and stand ready to share their expertise concerning the location of sources. The Collections Branch of the Museum Division arranges temporary loans of paintings and drawings from the Army Art Collection to private organizations that agree to display the art publicly in accordance with Army regulations. The army's museums and historical holdings throughout the country and abroad are generally open to the public, and their curators are available to answer reference questions. As a secured facility,  requests for an appointment at Fort Lesley J. McNair must be made at least a week in advance.

Image gallery

See also
 Department of Defense Historical Advisory Committee
 Naval History & Heritage Command
 Air Force Historical Research Agency
 United States Marine Corps History Division
 William Hammond (historian)

References

Further reading
The following publications provide additional information about the activities, services, and products of the Center of Military History:
 U.S. Army History CMH Online Bookshelves
 History of "History" in the U.S. Army
 Publications of the United States Army Center of Military History
 Army Historical Program(by fiscal year) 
 Oral History: Techniques and Procedures
 The U.S. Army Art and Photo Collection 
 Army History (a professional bulletin) 
 Organizational History

External links

 
 
 

1943 establishments in Washington, D.C.
History centers
Military historiography
Military history of the United States
History of the United States Army
Ceremonial units of the United States military